The women's snowboard cross competition of the 2018 Winter Paralympics was held at Jeongseon Alpine Centre, South Korea. The competition took place on 12 March 2018.

Medal table
The ranking in the table is based on information provided by the International Paralympic Committee (IPC) and will be consistent with IPC convention in its published medal tables. By default, the table will be ordered by the number of gold medals the athletes from a nation have won (in this context, a "nation" is an entity represented by a National Paralympic Committee). The number of silver medals is taken into consideration next and then the number of bronze medals. If nations are still tied, equal ranking is given and they are listed alphabetically by IPC country code.

Snowboard cross SB-LL1

Qualification

The top 4 athletes advanced to the elimination round.

Elimination round
The elimination round was started at 14:27.

Snowboard cross SB-LL2

Qualification
The qualification was held at 10:35.

Q — Qualified for the semifinals
q — Qualified for the quarterfinals

Elimination round
The elimination round was started at 14:05.

See also
Snowboarding at the 2018 Winter Olympics

References

External links

Women's snowboard cross